Lau Chin-shek (born 12 September 1944) was the President of the Hong Kong Confederation of Trade Unions and a member of the Legislative Council from 1991 to 2008.

Background
Lau was born in Guangzhou, Guangdong with family root in Shunde, Guangdong. He smuggled from Guangzhou to Hong Kong in 1960. Since the 1980s, he has been a labour activist, working to help factory workers in Sham Shui Po and Cheung Sha Wan, where working conditions were poor.

During the Tiananmen Square protests of 1989, Lau and other pro-democracy activists expressed sympathy and support to the student demonstrators who had gathered at Tiananmen Square. He and others also founded the Hong Kong Alliance in Support of Patriotic Democratic Movements of China, which organises the anniversary commemoration of the 1989 protests.

In 1990, Lau and other labour activists, including Lee Cheuk-yan, established the 160,000-strong Hong Kong Confederation of Trade Unions. He was also vice-chairman of the Hong Kong Christian Industrial Committee.

Lau fist ran in the Hong Kong legislative elections in 1991 and elected. Being re-elected four times, Lau sat in the Legislative Council continuously from 1991 to 2008, except he resigned in 1994 but elected again in 1995, a brief period during 1997 and 1998 when the sovereignty of Hong Kong was transferred to the People's Republic of China, and the Legislative Council temporarily became a Provisional Legislative Council which was filled with people indirectly hand picked by Beijing.

In recent years, however, Lau has moderated his stance against Beijing. He was expelled from the Democratic Party in 2000 because of dual party membership. Once branded subversive by the central authorities, Lau had been barred from entering mainland China for more than a decade. In May 2000, after quiet lobbying by Hong Kong top leaders, he was allowed to make a low-key visit to Guangzhou to see his ailing mother. Since then, he has been urging his pro-democracy colleagues to have "better communication with the Central Government" and visit mainland China and see for themselves the changes that are taking place in the country.

Lau lost his seat in the Legislative Council in the Legislative Election of 2008 with only 5.1% or 10,553 votes.

Lau revealed to have been diagnosed with colorectal cancer on a radio program in September 2008, saying it is under control. He then turned low profile in politics, but endorsed pro-Beijing candidate Carrie Lam in 2017 Chief Executive election.

References

External links
Lau Chin-shek's website
Hong Kong Legislative Council's website on Lau Chin-shek
Hong Kong Confederation of Trade Unions' election campaign website

Hong Kong justices of the peace
1944 births
Living people
Hong Kong Confederation of Trade Unions
Politicians from Guangzhou
Hong Kong trade unionists
Democratic Party (Hong Kong) politicians
The Frontier (Hong Kong) politicians
United Democrats of Hong Kong politicians
HK LegCo Members 1991–1995
HK LegCo Members 1995–1997
HK LegCo Members 1998–2000
HK LegCo Members 2000–2004
HK LegCo Members 2004–2008